Andrei Stanislavovich Olhovskiy (born 15 April 1966) is a former tennis player from Russia, who turned professional in 1989.

Career
Olhovskiy represented the Soviet Union at the 1988 Summer Olympics in Seoul and Russia at the 1996 Summer Olympics in Atlanta, where he reached the quarterfinals as a wild card before falling to Brazil's Fernando Meligeni.

The right-hander won two career titles in singles (Copenhagen, 1993 and Shanghai, 1996) and 20 titles in doubles, French Open (1993) and Australian Open (1994) champion in mixed doubles. Olhovskiy reached his highest ATP singles ranking on 14 June 1993, when he became world No. 49, and his highest doubles ranking of No. 6 (31 July 1995). He played for the Russia Davis Cup team from 1983 to 2001. He defeated No. 1 seed Jim Courier in the third round of Wimbledon in 1992.

Career finals

Singles (2 wins, 2 losses)

Doubles: 40 (20–20)

Doubles performance timeline

External links
 
 
 

Olympic tennis players of Russia
Olympic tennis players of the Soviet Union
Tennis players from Moscow
Russian male tennis players
Soviet male tennis players
Tennis players at the 1988 Summer Olympics
Tennis players at the 1996 Summer Olympics
1966 births
Living people
Grand Slam (tennis) champions in mixed doubles
Universiade medalists in tennis
Universiade silver medalists for the Soviet Union
Australian Open (tennis) champions
French Open champions
Medalists at the 1987 Summer Universiade